Burrington  may refer to:
Burrington, Devon, England
Burrington, Herefordshire, England
Burrington, Somerset, England
Burrington Combe, a limestone gorge and valley near Burrington, Somerset
Manchester, Iowa, USA, formerly known as Burrington